Everything Is Alive, Everything Is Breathing, Nothing Is Dead, and Nothing Is Bleeding is the debut studio album by American hardcore punk band The Chariot. It was recorded completely live and overdub-free (as well as never being mastered), giving the album a very raw sound.

Background
The Chariot was formed by vocalist Josh Scogin in 2003. Scogin was formerly the vocalist for Norma Jean, recording one album with them. During the band's performance at the 2002 Furnace Fest, Scogin announced that he would be departing Norma Jean. Scogin stated his departure was not due to any internal conflicts, but a personal choice. Shortly after his departure from Norma Jean, Scogin formed the Chariot with other musicians in the Douglasville, Georgia area; the band's name was inspired by the Biblical story of Elijah and the chariot of fire.

The band were signed to Solid State Records, a metal subdivision of Tooth & Nail Records, in 2004. The band's first song, "It Is Usually the Boys Who Cry Wolf That Grow up to Be the Men Who Cry Sanctuary", was released on the compilation This Is Solid State, Volume 5; this song was later re-recorded as "Yellow Dress: Locked Knees" for Everything Is Alive. Later that year, the band recorded its debut album with producer Matt Goldman.

The album name, Everything Is Alive, Everything Is Breathing, Nothing Is Dead, and Nothing Is Bleeding, is a parody of albums that feature morbid names.

Track listing

The song "Someday, in the Event That Mankind Actually Figures Out What it is That This World Revolves Around, Thousands of People are Going to Be Shocked and Perplexed to Find Out it Was Not Them. Sometimes, This Includes Me." (track 2) is currently the 13th longest song title, with 38 words.

The sampler at the end of Track 2 was a voicemail left on producer Matt Goldman's cell phone while he and the band were on a lunch break from recording.

When reversed, the talking at the end of Track 7 is Josh Scogin heard saying "That has to be a keeper 'cause I was mooning everybody."

Personnel
The Chariot
Josh Scogin – vocals
Keller Harbin – guitar, vocals
Joshua Beiser – bass
Tony Medina – guitar
Jeff Carter – drums, percussion

Additional musicians
Bradley Hathaway – backing vocals (track 4)
Matt Hinton – banjo
Troy Glessner – lap steel guitar

Notes

2004 debut albums
The Chariot (band) albums
Solid State Records albums
Tooth & Nail Records albums
Albums produced by Matt Goldman